Nyceryx magna is a moth of the  family Sphingidae.

Distribution 
It is known from Brazil, Costa Rica and Ecuador.

Description 
It can be distinguished from other Nyceryx species by the dark forewing upperside and the brownish-orange basal area and pale purple bands in the tornal angle of the hindwing upperside.

Biology 
Adults are on wing year round.

The larvae feed on Pentagonia donnell-smithii. Early instar larvae have very large heads and elongated tails. The head has a distinctive blue-green colour in the final instar and the tail is shorter and rough. The pupa is smooth and shiny with alternating light and dark bands on the abdomen.

References

Nyceryx
Moths described in 1874